Women's Combined World Cup 1984/1985

Calendar

Final point standings

In Women's Combined World Cup 1984/85 all 4 results count. All four events were won by athletes from Switzerland.

References
 fis-ski.com

World Cup
FIS Alpine Ski World Cup women's combined discipline titles